A199 may refer to:
 A199 road (Great Britain), a road connecting Leith in Edinburgh with West Barns, East Lothian, Scotland
 A199 motorway (France), a road connecting Noisy-le-Grand and Torcy